Kabhie Kabhie (1997) is an Indian television drama directed by Mahesh Bhatt and written by Anurag Kashyap, Akash Khurana, Vinta Nanda, Sameer Mody and Kamlesh Kunti Singh. Anil Sharma directed 25 episodes of the series.

The series was produced by Amit Khanna's Plus Channel and was telecast on Star Plus.

Cast
 Shefali Chaya as Radha Pathak
 Iravati Harshe as Mandira Joshi
 Lillete Dubey as Shama Joshi
 Alyy Khan as Vikram
 Deepak Parashar as Nirmal Joshi
 Rohit Roy as Vijay Sinha
 Surekha Sikri as Lakshmi Pathak
 Alok Nath
 Kunika

References

External links
 

StarPlus original programming
1997 Indian television series debuts
Indian drama television series